Girolamo Tiraboschi S.J. (18 December 1731 – 9 June 1794) was an Italian literary critic, the first historian of Italian literature.

Biography
Born in Bergamo, he studied at the Jesuit college in Monza, entered the order, and was appointed in 1755 professor of eloquence in the University of Milan. There he produced (1766–1768) Vetera humiliatorum monumenta (3 vols), a history of the extinct order of the Humiliati, which made his literary reputation.

Nominated in 1770 as librarian to Francis III, duke of Modena, he turned to account the copious materials there accumulated for the composition of his Storia della letteratura italiana. This vast work, in which Italian literature from the time of the Etruscans to the end of the 17th century is traced in detail, occupied eleven years, 1771–1782, and the thirteen quarto volumes embodying it appeared successively in Modena during that period.

A second enlarged edition (16 vols) was issued from 1787 to 1794, and was succeeded by many others, besides abridgments in German, French and English. Tiraboschi died in Modena on 3 June 1794, leaving a high reputation for virtue, learning and piety.

Tiraboschi also wrote, among many other works:
Biblioteca modenese (6 vols, 1781–1786) 
 
Memorie storiche modenesi (5 vols, 1793–1794)
He edited the Nuovo giornale dei letterati d'Italia (1773–1790), and left materials for a work of great research entitled Dizionario topografico-storico degli stati estensi (2 vols, 1824–1825),

Selected publications
 De patriae historia, Milano 1760;
 
 Storia della letteratura italiana, Modena, I edizione in 13 volumi, 1772–1782; II ed. rivista e ampliata, in 15 volumi, più un sedicesimo che contiene l'indice generale, 1787–1794); 
 Vita del Conte D. Fulvio Testi, Modena, 1780;
 
 Biblioteca Modenese 1781–1786  ; 
 Notizie biografiche e letterarie in continuazione della Biblioteca modonese, Reggio, 1796 (on-line)
 
 Storia dell'augusta abbazia di San Silvestro dì Nonantola, aggiuntovi il Codice Diplomatico della medesima illustrato con note, 2 volumi, Modena, 1784–1789; 
 Notizie de' pittori, scultori, incisori, architetti natii degli stati del duca di Modena, Modena, 1786;
 
 Notizie della Confraternita di San Pietro Martire in Modena, Modena, 1789; 
 Riflessioni sugli Scrittori Genealogici, Padova 1789; 
 Dell'origine della poesia rimata, opera di Giammaria Barbieri modenese, pubblicata e con annotazioni illustrata dal cav. ab. Girolamo Tiraboschi, Modena 1790; 
 Memorie storiche modenesi col Codice Diplomatico illustrato con note, 3 volumi, Modena, 1793–1795; 
 Dizionario topografico storico degli stati estensi, Modena, 1824–1825 (postumo)

Notes

Attribution

References
 Balduino, Armando; (Vittore Branca, ed.) (1973) Dizionario critico della letteratura italiana. Torino: UTET; vol. III, 502-506: Tiraboschi, Girolamo.
 Binni, Walter; (Emilio Cecchi & Natalino Sapegno, eds.) (1966) Storia della letteratura italiana . Milano: Garzanti; vol. VI, 628-630: La critica fra Illuminismo e Preromanticismo: Bettinelli e Baretti.
 

1731 births
1794 deaths
Writers from Bergamo
18th-century Italian historians
Italian art historians
18th-century Italian Jesuits
Academic staff of the University of Milan